Lukáš Gdula (born 6 December 1991) is a Czech racewalker. He competed in the 50 km event at the 2015 World Championships and 2016 Olympics. In 2018, he competed in the men's 50 kilometres walk at the 2018 European Athletics Championships held in Berlin, Germany. He finished in 21st place.

References

1991 births
Living people
Place of birth missing (living people)
Czech male racewalkers
World Athletics Championships athletes for the Czech Republic
Athletes (track and field) at the 2016 Summer Olympics
Olympic athletes of the Czech Republic
Czech Athletics Championships winners
Athletes (track and field) at the 2020 Summer Olympics